The Utah Jazz Radio Network is an American radio network consisting of 11 English language and one Spanish language radio stations which each carry coverage of the Utah Jazz, a professional basketball club which is a member of the National Basketball Association (NBA).

The network's flagship radio stations are "The Sports Zone," KZNS-AM 1280 and KZNS-FM 97.5. The network has affiliate stations in Utah and Idaho. David Locke has been the English radio play-by-play announcer since 2009, after leaving the play-by-play position with the Seattle SuperSonics.  Former Jazz player Ron Boone is the English color analyst.

The network's Spanish flagship station is KTUB 1600 AM. Nelson Morán is the Spanish-language play-by-play announcer/color analyst, Isidro Lopez is the Spanish-language play-by-play announcer, and Nicole Hernandez is the Spanish-language color analyst/sideline reporter.

The radio network broadcasts all preseason and all 82 regular season games.



Station list

English language stations

Utah

Idaho

Spanish language stations

References

External links
 Official Utah Jazz broadcast schedule and information
 The Zone Sports Network - 1280 AM and 97.5 FM

Utah Jazz
National Basketball Association on the radio
Mass media in Salt Lake City
Sports radio networks in the United States